Recoletos  may refer to:

The Order of Augustinian Recollects
Paseo de Recoletos
Recoletos (Madrid)
Convento de los Agustinos Recoletos (Madrid)